Maksim Konstantinovich Aktisov (born 28 January 2000) is a Russian football player. He plays for FC Tver.

Club career
He made his debut in the Russian Football National League for FC Spartak-2 Moscow on 20 April 2019 in a game against FC Mordovia Saransk.

References

External links
 
 
 Profile by Russian Football National League
 

2000 births
People from Cheboksary
Living people
Russian footballers
Russia youth international footballers
Association football midfielders
Association football defenders
FC Spartak-2 Moscow players
FC Lokomotiv Moscow players
Sportspeople from Chuvashia
21st-century Russian people
Russian First League players
Russian Second League players